Neerchal may refer to:

 Neerchal, Kannur, an area in Kannur District, Kerala, India
 Neerchal, Kasaragod, a village in Kasaragod District, Kerala, India